Pierre Jean Arsenault (born October 12, 1963 in Roberval, Quebec) is a Canadian professional baseball scout for the Miami Marlins of Major League Baseball and a former longtime bullpen coach and coordinator. He was listed as a coach for 16 consecutive seasons for the Montreal Expos (1992–2001) and the Florida Marlins (2002–2007).

As a Marlins coach, he was the first Quebecer to win the World Series in 2003.

He had previously been an assistant coach for the Québec Capitales of the Frontier League.

References

1963 births
Living people
Baseball people from Quebec
Concordia University alumni
Florida Marlins coaches
Major League Baseball bullpen coaches
Miami Marlins scouts
Montreal Expos coaches
People from Roberval, Quebec